Mucolipin-1 also known as TRPML1 (transient receptor potential cation channel, mucolipin subfamily, member 1) is a protein that in humans is encoded by the MCOLN1 gene.  It is a member of the small family of the TRPML channels, a subgroup of the large protein family of TRP ion channels.

TRPML1 is a 65 kDa protein associated with mucolipidosis type IV. Its predicted structure includes six transmembrane domains, a transient receptor potential (TRP) cation-channel domain, and an internal channel pore. TRPML1 is believed to channel iron ions across the endosome/lysosome membrane into the cell and so its malfunction causes cellular iron deficiency. It is important in lysosome function and plays a part in processes such as vesicular trafficking, exocytosis and autophagy.

Ligands
Agonists 
 ML-SA1
 MK6-83

See also
 transient receptor potential cation channel, mucolipin subfamily, member 2 (MCOLN2)
 transient receptor potential cation channel, mucolipin subfamily, member 3 (MCOLN3)
 mucolipidosis type IV
 TRPML

References

External links
  GeneReviews/NIH/NCBI/UW entry on Mucolipidosis IV